Irina Antonovna Sidorkova (born 27 June 2003 in Petrozavodsk), also known as Ira Sidorkova, is a Russian racing driver. She has competed in the W Series and the F3 Asian Championship.

Biography

Sidorkova began karting aged six, having been inspired to race by the film Cars. Having competed across Northern Russia and the Baltics with success – including an Estonian championship in 2012 – she moved into rallying aged 11 and touring car racing through the Russian Circuit Racing Series aged 13, both opportunities coming through Volkswagen. Having won the National Junior class title in 2018, SMP Racing invited Sidorkova to contest the final round of the Formula 4 Northern European Zone Championship where she finished thirteenth in all three races. The SMP Racing Junior Team took her on board in 2019, and she would contest both the Russian and Spanish Formula 4 series, finishing 6th in the former and 18th in the latter.

Sidorkova applied for the W Series for 2020, a Formula 3 championship for female drivers. She passed the evaluation tests, becoming the youngest driver to do so. She was set to contest the 2020 championship before it was cancelled in response to the COVID-19 pandemic. A 10-event eSports series was held on iRacing in its place, with Sidorkova taking third place in the championship. She returned to the Russian Circuit Racing Series to fill her empty season, and finished ninth overall in the Touring-Light class with a win at the NRING Circuit.

2021 would see Sidorkova make her debut in the W Series. She started the year racing in the F3 Asian Championship for Evans GP as preparation, where she failed to score any points and finished 22nd out of the 26 participants. She would however score her first W Series podium in only her second appearance, at the Red Bull Ring in Austria. The remainder of the season was plagued with inconsistency as she went on to score points only once more in Hungary and missed the Spa-Francorchamps round after testing positive for COVID-19. Her season was interrupted again in October, with Sidorkova being refused a U.S. visa and thus sitting out the season finale at the Circuit of the Americas. She eventually finished 9th in the standings.

In November 2021, Sidorkova was invited to take part in a one-day FIA Formula 3 test at Magny-Cours, alongside fellow W Series driver Nerea Martí and Iron Dames racers Maya Weug and Doriane Pin.

Sidorkova was set to return to the W Series for 2022, but restrictions placed on Russian drivers in response to the Russian invasion of Ukraine forced her out "until further notice." Due to the conflict she did not take part in any of the events that year and returned to the Russian Circuit Racing Series, finishing third outright in the Super Production category with a one race win.

Karting record

Karting career summary

Racing record

Racing career summary

Complete F4 Spanish Championship results 
(key) (Races in bold indicate pole position) (Races in italics indicate fastest lap)

Complete F3 Asian Championship results
(key) (Races in bold indicate pole position) (Races in italics indicate the fastest lap of top ten finishers)

Complete W Series results 

(key) (Races in bold indicate pole position) (Races in italics indicate fastest lap)

References

External links

 

Russian racing drivers
Russian Circuit Racing Series drivers
Female racing drivers
2003 births
Living people
Spanish F4 Championship drivers
W Series drivers
People from Petrozavodsk
F3 Asian Championship drivers
Sportspeople from the Republic of Karelia
SMP F4 Championship drivers
SMP Racing drivers
Drivex drivers